Pivdenne Design Office, located in Dnipro, Ukraine, is a designer of satellites and rockets, and formerly of Soviet intercontinental ballistic missiles (ICBMs), established by Mikhail Yangel. During Soviet times the bureau's OKB designation was OKB-586.

The company is in close co-operation with the PA Pivdenmash multi-product machine-building company, also situated in Dnipro. Pivdenmash is the main manufacturer of the models developed by Pivdenne Design Office.

Directors
 1954–1971 Mikhail Yangel
 1971–1991 Vladimir Utkin
 1991–2010 
 2010–2020

Products

Current

Ballistic missiles
Hrim-2

Orbital launch vehicles
Zenit rocket family
Zenit-2
Zenit-2M
Zenit-3F
Zenit-3SL
Zenit-3SLB
Antares first stage core, in cooperation with Orbital Sciences Corporation
Dnepr, converted R-36 ICBM
R-36 ICBM, NATO reporting name SS-18 'Satan'

Rocket engines
Main engines
RD-843
RD-853
RD-859

RD-861K
RD-866
RD-868
Steering engines
RD-8
RD-855
RD-856
Thrusters
Tsyklon-3 thruster
Tsyklon-3 thruster
Okean-O thruster 
Tsyklon-4 thruster

Planned

Orbital launch vehicles
Tsyklon rocket family
Cyclone-4M – first launch planned for 2023
Mayak rocket family

Rocket engines
Main engines
RD-801
RD-809
RD-809K
RD-810
DU-802

Satellites
Sich-2-1
Sich-2-M
Sich-3-O
Sich-3-P
YuzhSat
 YuzhSat-1
Mikrosat
Ionosat

Retired

Tsyklon rocket family
Tsyklon 2
Tsyklon-3
Kosmos-2I
Kosmos-3M
R-12 Dvina TBM, NATO reporting name SS-4 'Sandal'
R-14 Chusovaya ICBM, NATO reporting name SS-5 'Skean'
R-16 ICBM, NATO reporting name SS-7 'Saddler' (see also Nedelin catastrophe)
R-26 ICBM, NATO reporting name SS-8 'Sasin'
R-36 ICBM, NATO reporting name SS-9 'Scarp'
RT-20 ICBM, NATO reporting name SS-15 'Scrooge' (planned but never deployed)
MR-UR-100 Sotka ICBM, NATO reporting name SS-17 'Spanker'
RT-23 Molodets ICBM, NATO reporting name SS-24 'Scalpel'

See also
 List of design bureaus in Ukraine

References

External links
Company home page

Aerospace companies of Ukraine
Defence companies of Ukraine
State Space Agency of Ukraine
Ukrainian space institutions
Companies based in Dnipro
Aerospace companies of the Soviet Union
Defence companies of the Soviet Union
Science and technology in the Soviet Union
Antares (rocket family)
Design companies established in 1951
1951 establishments in the Soviet Union
1951 establishments in Ukraine
Design bureaus
Government-owned companies of Ukraine